Fana stadion is a multi-use stadium at Rådal in the borough of Fana in Bergen, Norway.

Used for football matches, it is the home ground of Second Division team Fana IL.

It also has a rubber track for track and field meets, and the stadium most notably hosted the 2004 Bergen Bislett Games. Then, a new world record in the women's 5000 metres was set by Elvan Abeylegesse. The stadium is also home to a world junior record, namely 83.87 metres by Andreas Thorkildsen in the men's javelin throw (June 2001). The venue hosted the Norwegian Athletics Championships in 1969, 1975, 1991 and 2005.

References

Football venues in Norway
Athletics (track and field) venues in Norway
Sports venues in Bergen
1969 establishments in Norway
Sports venues completed in 1969
Rugby union stadiums in Norway